Kentucky Route 581 (KY 581) is a  state highway in Kentucky that runs from Kentucky Route 40 in eastern Paintsville to U.S. Route 23 southwest of Georges Creek via Thealka, Tutor Key, Lost Creek, and Ray.

Major intersections

References

0581
Transportation in Johnson County, Kentucky
Transportation in Lawrence County, Kentucky